The 2022 Austin Gilgronis season was the 5th in the clubs history since their entry to the Major League Rugby in 2017. Sam Harris was the coach of the club for the second consecutive year. Bryce Campbell was the captain the club for the second consecutive year as well. The team finished the season in first in the Western Conference standings, but was later disqualified from competing in the 2022 Major League Rugby playoffs, due to violating league rules.

The Gilgronis played their home matchups at Bold Stadium in Austin, Texas.

Schedule

Standings

References

Austin Gilgronis seasons
Austin
2022 in sports in Texas